Oren Kriegel is an American contract bridge player. He was the lead writer on a 189-page report released on November 5, 2020, that looked into the hand records of Giorgio Duboin to determine whether or not Duboin obtained and used unauthorized information during online play.

Competitions

World championships 
In world competitions, he obtained the following results:

Domestic Competitions
In domestic competitions, Oren has obtained the following results: 

North American Collegiate Bridge Championship (1) - 2015

References

Sources 
 

American contract bridge players

Living people
Year of birth missing (living people)